Gahrbaran may refer to:
 Gahrbaran District
 Gahrbaran-e Jonubi Rural District
 Gahrbaran-e Shomali Rural District